Kozitsa is a village in Dzhebel Municipality, Kardzhali Province, southern Bulgaria.

References

Villages in Kardzhali Province